Québexit is a 2020 Canadian political comedy film, directed by Joshua Demers. The film's plot centres on the aftermath of a successful Quebec sovereignty referendum, focusing on conflicts at the new international Quebec-New Brunswick border between the Canadian Armed Forces, the new army of Quebec, and a pair of indigenous women whose ancestral land rights mean that they cannot be stopped from crossing the border at will.

The film's cast includes Gail Maurice, Xavier Yuvens, Alison Louder, Nicole Joy-Fraser, Daniel Gravelle, Alexandre Côté, Mélanie Bray, Voytek Skrzeta, Inderpal Saluja, Valérie Descheneaux, Andrew White-Martin, Emmanuel Kabongo, Nathalie Nadon, Florian François, Pierre Simpson, Kyle McDonald, Keenan Grom, Samantha Brown and Jennifer Vallance. It features dialogue in English, French and Cree; despite being set on the Quebec-New Brunswick border, the film was shot principally in Pickering, Ontario.

The film premiered at the Cinéfest Sudbury International Film Festival in September 2020. In December it was screened at the Whistler Film Festival, where Maurice, Yuvens and Demers won the Borsos Competition award for Best Screenplay in a Canadian Film.

References

External links

2020 films
2020 comedy films
Canadian political comedy films
Films shot in Ontario
Films set in New Brunswick
Films set in Quebec
First Nations films
English-language Canadian films
French-language Canadian films
2020s Canadian films
Cree-language films